Karrie Downey Larson (born May 30, 1973) is an American female volleyball player, and coach.

She was part of the United States women's national volleyball team at the 1998 FIVB Volleyball Women's World Championship in Japan.

References

External links
Clemson Tigers | Clemson University Athletics

1973 births
Living people
American women's volleyball players
Place of birth missing (living people)
American volleyball coaches
21st-century American women
Colorado Buffaloes women's volleyball players